Glen Dochart in Perthshire, Scottish Highlands is a glen which runs from Crianlarich eastwards to Killin, following the course of the River Dochart as it flows through Loch Dochart and Loch Iubhair. It is met by Glen Ogle at Lix Toll. Lochan Saorach lies within the glen and was once famous for its Floating island.

Notable People

Rev Prof Daniel Dewar born and raised here

References

Glens of Scotland
Valleys of Stirling (council area)